Hyperbaena valida is a species of plant in the family Menispermaceae. It is endemic to Jamaica.

References

Menispermaceae
Near threatened plants
Endemic flora of Jamaica
Taxonomy articles created by Polbot